New York University (NYU) Stern Global Programs offer three advanced degree programs in partnership with international schools.

TRIUM Global EMBA
TRIUM Global EMBA program is an alliance between NYU Stern School of Business, London School of Economics (LSE), and HEC School of Management, Paris.  The TRIUM program is ranked #3 in the world by the Financial Times 2010 review of EMBA programs.

Launched in 2001, the TRIUM program is designed to meet the business-learning needs of entrepreneurial and globally minded senior-level executives.  TRIUM draws on the specific strengths of each of the three alliance universities to deliver an  international curriculum that combines a global business curriculum with a socio-economic and socio-political context.

Academics and student profile
The TRIUM program takes place over 16 months, including 10 weeks out of the office.  Modules take place in London, New York, Paris, and in two emerging markets.  In the New York, London, and Paris modules, classes run over two weeks, while those in the emerging markets run over one week.

Students receive an MBA issued jointly by the three universities.

The student profile of the recent 2010 class is 65 global executives, whose average age is 40 and who have 15 years of work experience.  The students represent more than 30 nationalities, and work in a broad range of industries.

Master of Science in Global Finance
Master of Science in Global Finance (MSGF) is a joint program between New York University (NYU) Stern School of Business and the Hong Kong University of Science and Technology.

Academics and student profile
The MSGF program takes place over 12 months, with modules in Hong Kong, Beijing, and New York.  There are seven weekend modules in Hong Kong, one weekend class in Beijing, and a two-week module in New York.

The student profile of the current 2010 class is 48 international executives, whose average age is 32 and who have 8 years of work experience.

Master of Science in Risk Management Program for Executives
The Master of Science in Risk Management Program for Executives (MSRM) is an alliance between New York University (NYU) Stern School of Business and the Amsterdam Institute of Finance.

Academics and student profile
The MSRM program takes place over 12 months, with modules in Amsterdam and New York. There are four weekend sessions in Amsterdam, a two-week module in New York, and three distance-learning sessions.

The student profile of the recent 2010 class is 24 executives, whose average age is 44 and who have 15 years of work experience.

Professors
Professors who teach in each program are from the respective partner schools.  They include:

Edward Altman
Vincent Bastien
Michael Cox
Nicholas Crafts
Howard Davies
Aswath Damodaran
Dan Gode
Damian Tambini
Ingo Walter
Ngaire Woods

References

External links
TRIUM Global EMBA Program
Financial Times Rankings
LSE TRIUM site
Wall Street Journal Article, "An Executive M.B.A. with a Global Flavor"
Financial Times Article, "The Rankings: Best salaries Are in Americas"
"Financial Rewards That Set Courses Apart from the Crowd"
Financial Times Article, "The Rankings: Evolution of Species Sees Joint Degree on the Rise"
Master of Science in Risk Management Program for Executives
Master of Science in Global Finance

New York University
Business qualifications